Santa Paula Unified School District is a public school district in Ventura County, California, United States. It was established in July 2013 from the merger of the Santa Paula Elementary School District and the city's high school, which was governed by the Santa Paula Union High School District.  Many schools in Santa Paula, largely serving students from low-income families, are scoring low in state-administered tests, below the 30th percentile in statewide comparisons. The superintendent as of July 2018 is Dr. Ed Cora.

Governing Board 
The board of trustees includes:

 Pamela Thompson, President
 Jeri Mead, VP
 Michelle Kolbeck, Clerk
 Derek Luna
 Christina Urias

Schools 
Elementary 
 Barbara Webster Elementary
 Thelma Bedell Elementary
 Blanchard Elementary
 Glenn City Elementary
 McKevett Elementary
 Grace Thille Elementary
Middle 
 Isbell Middle School

High
 Renaissance (Continuation) High School
 Santa Paula High School

References 

School districts in Ventura County, California
Santa Paula, California
2013 establishments in California
School districts established in 2013